Rosario, officially the Municipality of Rosario,  is a 1st class municipality in the province of Cavite, Philippines. According to the 2020 census, it has a population of 110,807 people.

Formerly known as  Salinas, Rosario has an area of 5.6 square kilometers, making it the most densely populated city/municipality in Cavite at 16,473 per km2. With the continuous expansion of Metro Manila, the municipality is now included in Manila conurbation which reaches Lipa, Batangas in its southernmost part. It is accessible by land and water transportation.

Etymology
There are three religious versions for naming the town "Rosario." These are:

The first version says, the image of the Madonna and the Child was found one day floating on the water by a group of kids playing along the seashore. They played with the image, using it as a toy and afterwards hid it in the bushes near the sea. Every time they came back, however, they would see the image already floating leisurely on the water, as if waiting for them. They thought it strange, but could not explain how the image got back to the water.

Not long after their elders learned about the image and took it to an empty nipa shack. Thus began a public veneration of the Madonna and Child. The hut was transformed into a place of worship. News of miraculous happenings attributed to the image spread around. The religious fervor was so great and the people were moved by the image that they decided to adopt it as the patroness of the town and changed the name Salinas Marcella to Rosario.

The different names given to the town are remembered. Marcella exists as one of the national roads of the town. Salinas is associated with the finest and famous smoked fish (Tinapang Salinas) produced by the townspeople.

Rosario was formerly called Tejero, which may have originated from the word tejer (Spanish to weave) because weaving fish nets was then the main occupation of the women. Rosario was also called Salinas derived from the word sal (Spanish salt) during the Philippine Revolution because salt-making was a prime industry of the town.  The place was likewise called Marcella or Marcelles due to its proximity to the sea (“mar” in Spanish). Rosario was, finally, named in honor of their patroness Nuestra Señora Virgen del Santissimo Rosario, Reina de Caracol or (Our Lady of the Most Holy Rosary).

History 
On October 22, 1845, Spanish Governor General Narciso Claveria promulgated a Decree for the establishment of a new town comprising Salinas-Leiton and Tierra Alta of San Francisco de Malabon, what is now the city of General Trias. On October 27, Don Juan Arlegui, Vicar-General of the Archdiocese of Manila informed the Politico-Military Governor of Cavite Don Miguel Roca, that he was designated by the Governor-General to look for a person of unquestionable integrity who will be entrusted with the money for the construction of the church building.

On November 3, 1845, presbyter Don Mamerto Mariano Ner, who was at that time one of the priests of the Curia of Manila, was appointed as the first parish priest and served until December 1866.

The municipality of Rosario was originally a part of San Francisco de Malabon (now General Trias). It became an independent municipality in 1846, one year after the founding of the Santissimo Rosario Parish. The second smallest town in Cavite Province, Rosario has now emerged into the " biggest, not in terms of its land area nor its per capita income but because of the great transitions that occurred with the town's political, social, cultural and economic developments since 1845.

Geography 
It occupies part of the north to north-western section of the province along the western coast of Luzon. It is flanked by Noveleta on the east, Manila Bay on the north, General Trias on the southeast and Tanza on the south-west.

Land area 
Rosario has a land area of only 569 hectares, as based on previous data recorded. At present, the municipality has not yet conducted any cadastral survey of its juridical land territory. A total of twenty (20) barangays make up this lowland coastal town.

Climate

Barangays 

Rosario is politically subdivided into 20 barangays.

Demographics

Rosario's potential labor force comprises 59.25% of the figure given above, with the majority engaged in fishing and trade activities. The growth rate is 3.63%.

Religion 
Roman Catholic is the prominent religion of Rosario. There are two Catholic churches. One is in Poblacion,The Most Holy Rosary Parish, and another one in Ligtong,San Isidro Labrador Parish. Recently, Islam was introduced by the Maranao business people from Mindanao. The other religions in Rosario includes Iglesia ni Cristo and Born Again Christians.

Economy 

Fishing is a major economic activity due to the abundant fishing grounds particularly in Barangays Wawa, Sapa Muzon and Ligtong. The Rosario Fish Port in Barangay Sapa is a major fishing port. Predominant cottage industries related to fishing include smoked fish (tinapa) processing, fish drying (daing), fish paste (bagoong) making, fish sauce (patis) making and canning.  Marine species caught within municipal fishing grounds include squid, mackerel, slipmouth, herring, goatfish, tuna, mullet, porgy, shrimp, barracuda, cavalla, snapper, catfish and roundscad.

The Fil-Oil Development and Management Corporation (FMDC) has begun developing  of the Philippine National Oil Corporation property into a special economic zone, the Cavite Economic Zone, that will include an industrial estate, low-cost housing, and a new port facility.

On November 20, 2009, SM Prime Holdings, the largest mall-operator in the country, opened its 36th mall: SM City Rosario.

Government

Elected officials
The following are the elected officials of the town elected last May 13, 2019 which serves until 2022:

List of former municipal heads

Gobernadorcillos
 1845 - Jacinto Jimenez
 1846 - Pablo Buendia
 1847 - Ventura Caldeira
 1848 - Jacinto Jimenez
 1849 - Adriano Zacarias
 1850 - Reducindo Cruz
 1851 - Pablo Buendia
 1852 - Jacinto Jimenez
 1853 - Reducindo Buenviaje
 1854 - Roberto Jimenez
 1855 - Lino Ner
 1856 - Lino Ner
 1857 - Benito Atangan
 1858 - Isidoro Gonzales
 1859 - Natalio Buenaflor
 1860 - Tomas Panganiban
 1861-1862 - Isidoro Gonzales
 1863-1864 - Lino Ner
 1865-1866 - Bernabe Raqueno
 1867-1868 - Lino Ner
 1869-1870 - Juan Buendia
 1871-1872 - Benito Atangan
 1873-1874 - Basilio Copon
 1875-1877 - Lino Ner
 1878-1879 - Bernabe Raqueño
 1880-1881 - Mariano Odvina
 1882-1883 - Francisco Prudente
 1884-1885 - Ciriaco Abutin
 1886-1887 - Pantaleon Raqueño
 1888-     - Francisco Sales
 1889-1890 - Mariano Punzalan
 1891-1892 - Pablo Raqueño

Capitan Presidents
 1893      - Roman Bulda
 1894 Marcelo Rodriguez
 1895-1898 - Catalino Abueg

Presidente Municipal
 1899-1900 - Catalino Abueg
 1901-1905 - Andres Ner
 1906-1907 - Benigno Santi
 1908-1909 - Andres Villanueva
 1910-1912 - Andres Giongco
 1913-1915 - Pascual Jimenez
 1915-1922 - Julio Mata
 1922-1925 - Andres Giongco
 1925-1930 - Julio Mata
 1930-1934 - Narciso Jimenez Ner

Municipal Mayors
 1934-1937 - Julio Mata
 1938-1941 - Jose Castro
 1942-1943 - Agustin Abadilla

Japanese sponsored Mayor
 1944-1945 - Julio Mata

Liberation Military Mayor
 1945      - Narciso Jimenez Ner

Appointed by Pres. Osmena
 1946      - David Jimenez

Appointed by Pres. Roxas
 1947      - Julio Mata

Municipal Mayor
 1948-1951 - Remigio Cruz Prudente
 1952-1959 - Antonio Guhit
 1960-1963 - Pedro Giongco
 1964–1978, 1980-1986 - Calixto Enriquez
 1978-1980 - Agripina Abueg
 1986-1988 - Oscar Reyes
 1988-1992 - Ernesto Andico
 1992–1998, 2007–2016, 2019–2020 - Jose M. Ricafrente, Jr.
 1998-2007 - Renato M. Abutan
 2016–2019, 2020–present - Jose V. Ricafrente III

Education 
Primary schools:
 Rosario Elementary School
 Agustin Abadilla Elementary School
 David P. Jimenez Elementary School
 Mayor Calixto D. Enriquez Elementary School (Ligtong Elem. School)
 Silangan Elementary School Founded June 18, 1962
 Bagbag I Elementary School-Main (Greenfields Subd.)
 Bagbag II Elementary School-Annex (Sunrise Subd.)
 Tejeros Convention Elementary School
 Bible Christian Academy (Cuevas Subd.)
 Galilee Academy (Manggahan Compound)
 Santo Rosario Catholic School (Most Holy Rosary Parish Compound)
 King Arthur Academy of Cavite, Inc. (Karlaville Subd.)

Secondary schools:
 Bagbag National High School
 Cafuir Learning Center (defunct)
 Cavite State University - Science Education Laboratory School
 Rosario Institute
 Rosario National High School
Escuela Secondaria Señor de Salinas
 STI High School - Rosario
 Bible Christian Academy (Cuevas Subd)
 Galilee Academy (Manggahan Compound)
 Santo Rosario Catholic School (Most Holy Rosary Parish Compound)

Tertiary schools:
 Cavite State University Rosario Campus
 STI College - Rosario Branch
 Imus Computer College - Rosario Branch
 Datacom Institute of Computer and Technology - Rosario Campus

Gallery

See also 
 List of renamed cities and municipalities in the Philippines

References

External links 

Rosario, Cavite -  cavite.gov.ph
[ Philippine Standard Geographic Code]
Philippine Census Information

Municipalities of Cavite
Populated places on Manila Bay